Nowhere to Hide is a 1994 American made-for-television drama film starring Rosanna Arquette and Scott Bakula. The movie was written by Dan Gordon and directed by Bobby Roth.

Plot
A woman in a witness protection program falls in love with the agent charged with protecting her. The agent turns out to be someone hired by her soon-to-be-ex-husband to make it look as if she is on the run so that he can defame her in court in order to get custody of their son.

Cast
 Rosanna Arquette as Sarah Blake
 Scott Bakula as Kevin Nicholas
 Max Pomeranc as Sam Blake
 Clifton Powell as Braddock
 Robert Wisden
 Jenny Gago
 Jerry Wasserman
 Jill Teed
 Chris Mulkey
 Laurie Paton
 Nancy McClure
 Peter Lecriox
 Jill Teed
 DeeJay Jackson.
 Richmond Arquette

References

External links
 

1994 television films
1994 films
1994 drama films
Films directed by Bobby Roth
Films scored by Gary Chang
Films about divorce
American drama television films
1990s American films